North Westminster Community School was a comprehensive school in London, England, formed in 1981 by the amalgamation of Rutherford School, Sarah Siddons Girls' School, and Paddington School. It closed in 2006 and was replaced by three new schools: Paddington Academy, King Solomon Academy and Westminster Academy.

Educational institutions established in 1981
1981 establishments in England
Defunct schools in the City of Westminster
Educational institutions disestablished in 2006
2006 disestablishments in England